The Stark Tower Complex is a fictional high-rise building complex appearing in American comic books published by Marvel Comics. Located in Midtown Manhattan, New York City, USA, the complex is named after its owner Tony Stark, who is the alter ego of the superhero Iron Man. The structure is composed of a 93-story Main Tower flanked by a 35-story South Building and 55-story North Building. Located at the top of the Main Tower was the Watchtower of the superhero The Sentry, but it has been replaced by Heimdall's observatory. The Main Tower is informally known as Avengers Tower, as it serves as the headquarters of the superhero team, the Avengers, similar to the Avengers Mansion. Currently, the main Stark Tower is located in Broadway, occupying the space where the Condé Nast Building is in the real world.

The Stark Tower, eventually changed to Avengers Tower, has been shown in various films set in the Marvel Cinematic Universe, beginning with The Avengers (2012)

Fictional history
The Stark Tower Complex was built as a world-class financial and business facility to complement the Midtown Manhattan business district. The building was completed as a gleaming beacon of modern architecture after four years of excavation and construction. It is located in the vicinity of Manhattan's Columbus Circle approximately 10 blocks north of the Baxter Building, headquarters of the superhero team the Fantastic Four.

While initially intending to use the top three floors of the Main Tower as his state-of-the-art bachelor pad, Stark gave them over to the Avengers as their base of operations after their former base, Avengers Mansion, was destroyed. Longtime caretaker of the Avengers Mansion Edwin Jarvis was asked to resume his duties in the new location. Later, when the Sentry became a member of the Avengers, his long-hidden Watchtower appeared, integrating itself atop the Main Tower, fully integrated into the building's existing architecture. Serving as both Sentry's headquarters and as the private residences of Robert Reynolds and his wife Lindy, the 20-story watchtower is operated and maintained by CLOC (Centrally Located Organic Computer), a near-sentient computer of Sentry's own design. The lower levels of the Main Tower, along with both the South and North Buildings, are largely occupied with Stark's subsidiaries and non-profit organizations.

After the passing of the Superhuman Registration Act (SRA), Iron Man was tapped to head the task force charged with enforcing the Act. Subsequently, Stark Tower became the base of operations of the task force. The controversy surrounding the SRA broke the Avengers team apart leaving Tony Stark to form a new team, the Mighty Avengers, who continue to occupy the Main Tower's higher levels. When the Tower became the headquarters of the SRA task force, it was assigned by the government a squad of Cape-Killer guards with the call sign "Force Unit 9".

During the events of World War Hulk, a violent battle between The Hulk and Iron Man nearly caused the collapse of Stark Tower. The tower was rebuilt by Stark under his S.H.I.E.L.D. organization, making it S.H.I.E.L.D. property.

Stark Tower becomes the setting for a multi-issue conflict between humans and a murderous Skrull hunting them for sport. During the "Secret Invasion", many non-powered New York citizens, including Daily Bugle reporter Ben Urich, end up at Stark Tower. Unfortunately, it had become the hunting ground for a Skrull. He is shown killing most of the members of a design firm that had rented space in the building. Ben Urich regains control of the security shutters and the Skrull is tricked into throwing itself out a high window. It dies on impact.

When Norman Osborn took over S.H.I.E.L.D., and renamed it H.A.M.M.E.R., he also took ownership of the tower. After Osborn is removed from power following the Siege of Asgard, the tower is returned to Stark. With the Sentry's death, his watch tower disappeared from the rooftop where it is replaced by Heimdall's observatory as sign of solidarity between Earth and Asgard.

During the events of the Fear Itself storyline, Thing acquired a hammer. This transformed him into a being with Asgardian-like power called Angir: Breaker of Souls. Red Hulk started to fight him to protect the innocents, but got batted away by Thing. Red Hulk survived though and to try and remedy it, Thing tossed his hammer through Avengers Tower, bringing it down onto Red Hulk.

A new Stark Tower was later built on the site of the original. The structure also acted as the headquarters of the Avengers.

When the Avengers fell under S.H.I.E.L.D.'s authority, S.H.I.E.L.D. took over the Stark Tower, and made it their Golgotha station.

During the Secret Wars storyline, Stark Tower is destroyed by the Children of Tomorrow during the incursion between Earth-616 and Earth-1610.

Following an eight-month ellipsis, Tony, who is suffering financial difficulties at the time, is forced to sell the rebuilt Stark Tower to a Chinese company called Qeng Enterprises. Tony and the rest of the Avengers relocate to another Stark Tower which had been built near Time Square.

Reception

Accolades 

 In 2019, CBR.com ranked the Avengers Tower 1st in their "10 Most Iconic Superhero Hideouts In Marvel Comics" list.
 In 2020, CBR.com ranked the Stark Tower 6th in their "Avengers 10 Best Headquarters" list.

Other versions

Marvel Adventures
Stark Tower serves as the Avengers' base in Marvel Adventures: The Avengers. The roster who live in it are Captain America, Iron Man, The Hulk, Spider-Man, Giant Girl, Wolverine, and Storm.

Ultimate Marvel
In the Ultimate Marvel universe, Stark Tower is the residence of Tony Stark, Thor, and Jane Foster.

In other media

Television
 Stark Tower appears in The Avengers: Earth's Mightiest Heroes, though it is only seen in a few episodes since the team is based out of the Avengers Mansion in the series. It is prominently featured in the episode "Alone Against A.I.M." when A.I.M.'s Scientist Supreme leads a raid on Stark Tower and unleashes Technovore to target Tony Stark.
 In Avengers Assemble, the Avengers Tower is the new headquarters for the heroes to train and live after the destruction of the Avengers Mansion in the series premiere. It is modeled after its appearance in the 2012 The Avengers film. In the episode "Avengers Disassembled," Ultron takes over the systems of Avengers Tower by controlling the Iron Man armors. Before Ultron can send the Stark satellites crashing on every major city, Iron Man blows up the Arc Reactor causing parts of Avengers Tower to explode in order to keep Ultron from tapping into the Stark satellites.
 Avengers Tower appears in a motion poster advertisements for Daredevil, Jessica Jones, Luke Cage and Iron Fist. However, in all four shows, the MetLife Building, which actually exists there, appears instead.
 Avengers Tower serves as the Avengers' headquarters in Marvel Future Avengers.
 In episode five of the Disney+ TV series, Loki, a brief shot of a damaged Stark Tower appears in the Void to which pruned variants have been sent, along with other landmark New York City buildings.

Film
Stark Tower, and later renamed Avengers Tower, appears in the Marvel Cinematic Universe:

 In The Avengers, the Tower is constructed in Midtown Manhattan by Tony Stark, it is powered by its own independent arc reactor, capable of sustaining the tower for a year without any cost to the city. The tower's unique power sustainability inspires Loki to select the tower as the prime location to harness the Tesseract and open a wormhole to draw his army to Earth. After the battle between Loki's forces and the Avengers, the upper levels of the tower are destroyed, along with the majority of the "STARK" insignia that adorned one side of the tower (the only remaining letter is an "A", as a nod to the Avengers). Stark and Pepper Potts are later seen with plans for revisions to Stark Tower, showing sleeping quarters will be available for each Avenger–as signified by each hero's symbol shown on different floors ("Sleeping Quarters 6", with a symbol of Captain America's shield, is the clearest one on screen) and an airpad. Multiple visuals show the tower projecting out from within the bottom half of the MetLife Building. The MetLife Building was purchased by Stark, who had the upper portion of the building deconstructed to accommodate the construction of Stark Tower.
 In Captain America: The Winter Soldier, a refurbished image of the Tower is seen, including an aircraft hangar and the Avengers "A" logo.
 In Avengers: Age of Ultron, the Tower is the Avengers' main base and features a lounge area, three laboratory areas, a machine room, a gym, a relaxation area, and a locker room. There, Stark and Banner work on a project and create Ultron. The Avengers host a celebratory party where Rogers invites Sam Wilson to attend. Afterwards, Ultron reveals himself as villainous and attacks the Avengers. After a mission, the Avengers return to the Tower along with new recruits Wanda Maximoff and Pietro Maximoff, where the android Vision is created. At the end of the film. the Avengers move out of the Tower and into the Avengers Compound in Upstate New York. 
In Captain America: Civil War, the Tower is seen briefly in footage shown by Thaddeus Ross to the Avengers of the Battle of New York. It is also briefly seen in an establishing shot before Stark recuits Peter Parker.
 In Doctor Strange, the Tower is seen in an establishing shot before Stephen Strange's car accident and again during Strange's battle in the Mirror Dimension.
 In Spider-Man: Homecoming, the Tower appears when Happy Hogan is inside getting the last of the Avengers’ items transported onto a cargo plane, as the Tower is being sold.
 In Avengers: Infinity War, the Tower is briefly seen when the Q-Ship arrives in New York.
 In Avengers: Endgame, an alternate version of the Tower appears when Stark, Rogers, and Scott Lang quantum time travel to an alternate 2012 timeline to retrieve the Space and Mind Stones. Rogers ends up dueling his alternate self in the Tower.
 In Spider-Man: Far From Home, the Tower, now newly redesigned (with a hole in the middle as a terrace), is seen when Parker swings past it.

Video games
 Stark Tower is a base and level in Marvel: Ultimate Alliance video game. After the S.H.I.E.L.D. Helicarrier UNN Alpha is damaged by the attack of Dr. Doom's Masters of Evil, Tony Stark offers his property as a provisional base of operations. The heroes are based there up until the mission in the Valley of Spirits, after which they relocate to Doctor Strange's Sanctum Sanctorum to cope with the Masters of Evil's access to the magical knowledge of Baron Mordo and Loki. Later, towards the end of the game, the heroes return to a Doom-warped version of Stark Tower (dubbed "Doomstark" in the game), where the player must assist Nick Fury on fighting hordes of Iron Man-like drones sent by Doom, and prepare for the upcoming battle in Doom's Castle in Latveria. In a cutscene, Stark states that there are 40 stories in this version of the tower. Also, his lab complex becomes available for navigation after beating the Omega Base mission.
 Stark Tower is a full level in The Punisher. Frank Castle infiltrates it after learning that the Eternal Sun gang wants to steal some high technology from the tower. Iron Man appears after Punisher's departure, watching the huge mess the mafia and the vigilante caused.
 Stark Tower is also a landmark in The Incredible Hulk and can be destroyed. Within the game it is stated to be the second-tallest building on Manhattan, between Empire State Building and Chrysler Building.
 Stark Tower is featured in Spider-Man: Web of Shadows. It is minor at first in that the player can casually visit the spot. Later on, it is one of the most important areas in which the building is the safest possible area (besides Wilson Fisk Industries which is later on another safe zone) due to the symbiote invasion. During that time, Stark Tower serves as a rescue shelter and a temporary hospital. Black Widow and S.H.I.E.L.D. use Stark Tower as the safe zone of civilians and boot camp of S.H.I.E.L.D. Spider-Man could rescue civilians and place the civilians at the safe zone besides Security Domes. All S.H.I.E.L.D. agents, caravans, airships and un-infected civilians are located there. To ensure its safety, electric fences are barricaded there which could un-infect a symbiote creature. Black Widow tells about their safe zone and plan to Spider-Man and a released Tinkerer. At one part of the story, it is under attack by Zombie Symbiote and Slasher Symbiotes who try to open the barriers. Spider-Man helps defeat the Zombie Symbiotes while S.H.I.E.L.D. loads all the civilians into an aircraft. One barrier opens, so Berserker Symbiotes attack and try to get into Stark Tower. Spider-Man calls in an air strike. The air strike eliminates the symbiotes and Stark Tower is safe once again. As in the main comics, the Sentry's Watchtower is on top of the tower.
 Stark Tower appears in Marvel: Ultimate Alliance 2 as the main hub during Act 1, and as the hub for Iron Man's Pro-Registration side during Act 2. Its layout is identical to how it appeared in Marvel: Ultimate Alliance, but does not allow entry into Iron Man's lab complex. Later in the game, it falls into The Fold's control after the heroes positioned there are defeated.
 A room that resembles Stark Tower can be visited by players at the Marvel Super Hero Takeover 2013 event on Club Penguin.
 Avengers Tower is the main headquarters in the video game Marvel Heroes. Both playable and non-playable heroes, as well as S.H.I.E.L.D. agents can be seen at the tower.
 Stark Tower appears in Lego Marvel Super Heroes. There is a level where Captain America have to stop Aldrich Killian and Mandarin from taking over Stark Tower. A bonus mission at Stark Tower has Iron Man and War Machine setting things up for a party at Stark Tower which also included them going in a dance-off against the Iron Patriot armor.
 The Avengers Tower appears in Lego Marvel's Avengers as a landmark and serves a hub to explore inside.
 The Avengers Tower briefing room appears as a stage in Marvel vs. Capcom: Infinite. In the game's story, the tower now appears as part of New Metro City following the merging of the worlds, and serves as the headquarters for the allied heroes. However, it later comes under attack by the forces of Ultron Sigma and Jedah Dohma.
 The Avengers Tower appears as a recurring landmark in the Marvel's Spider-Man series developed by Insomniac Games. In Marvel's Spider-Man (2018), it is revealed that Peter Parker had managed to capture the criminal Sandman some time prior to the events of the game, and had him contained in a vial that he stored in a school backpack that he had webbed to the top of the Tower.

Toys
 Stark Tower features as a location in Marvel's VS System trading card game.
 Avengers Tower is also a Lego Super Heroes set.

References

Avengers (comics)
Iron Man
Fictional towers
Marvel Comics locations
S.H.I.E.L.D.
Fictional buildings and structures originating in comic books